Lytton is a surname. Notable people with the surname include:

 Antony Bulwer-Lytton, Viscount Knebworth (1903–1933), British pilot and politician
 Lady Constance Lytton (1869–1923), British suffragette activist, writer, speaker and campaigner
 David Lytton-Cobbold, 2nd Baron Cobbold (born 1937), English banker and country house manager
 Edward Bulwer-Lytton, 1st Baron Lytton (1803–1873), English novelist, poet, playwright, and politician
 Elizabeth Barbara Lytton (1773–1843), foremother of the Bulwer-Lytton family
 Sir Henry Lytton (1865–1936), English actor and singer
 Henry Lytton-Cobbold, 3rd Baron Cobbold (born 1962), English screenwriter and country house manager
 Hugh Lytton (1921–2002), Canadian psychologist
 John Lytton, 5th Earl of Lytton (born 1950), British surveyor and House of Lords member
 Judith Blunt-Lytton, 16th Baroness Wentworth (1873–1957), British peer, Arabian horse breeder and real tennis player
 Louisa Lytton (born 1989), English actress
 Neville Bulwer-Lytton, 3rd Earl of Lytton (1879–1951), British military officer and artist
 Noel Lytton, 4th Earl of Lytton (1900–1985), British Army officer and writer
 Paul Lytton (born 1947), English jazz percussionist
 Philip Lytton, pseudonym of Charles Ernest Phillips (died 1949), Australian actor and theatrical entrepreneur
 Robert Bulwer-Lytton, 1st Earl of Lytton (1831–1891), English statesman and poet, Viceroy of India during the Great Famine of 1876–78
 Rogers Lytton (1867–1924), American film actor
 Sir Roland Lytton (or Rowland Litton, 1561–1615), English lawyer and politician
 Sir Rowland Lytton (c.1615–1674), English politician
 Rosina Bulwer Lytton (1802–1882), English novelist and essayist
 Victor Bulwer-Lytton, 2nd Earl of Lytton (1876–1947), British politician and colonial administrator
 Sir William Lytton (1586–1660), English politician

Fictional characters:
 Lytton (Doctor Who), recurring character in BBC science fiction series Doctor Who
 Vanessa Lytton in BBC medical drama series Holby City

See also
 Litton (surname)